Saint-Malo-des-Trois-Fontaines is a commune in the Morbihan department of Brittany in north-western France. Inhabitants of Saint-Malo-des-Trois-Fontaines are called in French Malouins.

See also
Communes of the Morbihan department

References

External links

 Mayors of Morbihan Association 

Saintmalodestroisfontaines